Edmond Carmody, D.D., (born January 12, 1934) is an Irish-born American prelate of the Roman Catholic Church.  He served as bishop of the Diocese of Corpus Christi in Texas (2000 to 2010), bishop of the Diocese of Tyler in Texas (1992 to 2000) and as auxiliary bishop of the Archdiocese of San Antonio in Texas (1988 to 1992).  While still a priest, Carmody spent five years working as a missionary in Ecuador.

Biography

Early life 
Edmond Carmody was born on January 12, 1934, in Ahalane, Moyvane, County Kerry, in Ireland. He was second child of Michael Carmody and Mary Stack who had 12 other children. Carmody received his primary education at a local national school in Ireland, then attended St. Brendan's Seminary in Killarney, Ireland for his high school education.  After finishing at St. Brendan's, he entered the Major Seminary of St. Patrick in Carlow, Ireland, for his priestly formation .

Priesthood 
Carmody was ordained into the priesthood at St. Patrick Seminary by Bishop Thomas Keogh on June 8,1957, for the Archdiocese of San Antonio. After his ordination, Carmody emigrated to the United States in September 1951, going to San Antonio.

After a few weeks at St. Mary's Parish in Victoria, Texas, Carmody was assigned on November 22, 1957, as associate pastor at St. Margaret Mary's Parish in San Antonio.  After three years at St. Margaret's, Carmody was transferred on September 16, 1960, to be associate pastor at St. Henry's Parish In San Antonio.

Aside from his pastoral assignments, Carmody was named on February 4, 1965, as assistant archdiocesan chaplain of scouts.  On August 29, 1966, he was appointed secretary to the Archdiocesan Tribunal and chaplain of Incarnate Word High School in San Antonio. Carmody participated in the Tribunal and at the high school for the next  17 years. He also served as a Catholic chaplain to the Texas Army National Guard for six years.

In 1968 Carmody received a Master of Education degree from Our Lady of the Lake University in San Antonio and in 1973 a Master of Social Work degree.

In 1982, Carmody went to Guayaquil, Ecuador to serve with the Missionary Society of St. James the Apostle.  A few days before his scheduled return to Texas in 1988, Archbishop Patrick Flores recalled him immediately because of his appointment as auxiliary bishop.

Auxiliary Bishop of San Antonio 
Pope John Paul II appointed Carmody as an auxiliary bishop for the Archdiocese of San Antonio and titular bishop of Murthlacum on November 8, 1988.  He was consecrated on December 15, 1988.  The principal consecrator was Archbishop Flores; his principal co-consecrators were Bishop Charles Grahmann and Bishop Charles Herzig.

Bishop of Tyler 
On 24 March 1992, John Paul II appointed Carmody as bishop of the Diocese of Tyler.  He was installed on May 25, 1992.

Bishop of Corpus Christi 
On February 3, 2000, John Paul II appointed Carmody as bishop of the Diocese of Corpus Christi.  He was installed on March 17, 2000.  In 2006, Carmody founded John Paul II High School in Corpus Christi.

Retirement 
When Carmody reached the mandatory retirement age of 75 in 2009, he sent his letter of resignation as bishop of Corpus Christi to Pope Benedict XVI.  The pope accepted his resignation and named then Reverend William Mulvey as his replacement on January 18, 2010.  

After his retirement, Carmody taught a class in church history at John Paul II High School until he returned to Tyler in 2013.He served as the vicar general and moderator of the curia for the Diocese of Tyler until 2015. Carmody then moved back to Corpus Christi.

See also

References

Sources
 Diocese of Corpus Christi www.diocesecc.org Retrieved: 2010-04-16.

External links
 Roman Catholic Diocese of Corpus Christi Official Site 
 Roman Catholic Diocese of Tyler
 Roman Catholic Archdiocese of San Antonio

Episcopal succession

Clergy from County Kerry
Alumni of Carlow College
People educated at St Brendan's College, Killarney
20th-century Roman Catholic bishops in the United States
21st-century Roman Catholic bishops in the United States
1934 births
Living people
Irish emigrants to the United States